Heatherton is a surname. Notable people with the surname include:

 Erin Heatherton (born 1989), American model
 Joey Heatherton (born 1944), American actress, dancer, and singer, daughter of Ray
 Ray Heatherton (1909–1997), American singer
 Todd Heatherton, American psychologist